Park Island is a private housing estate located at Ma Wan, an island in Tsuen Wan, New Territories, Hong Kong. It was mainly developed by Sun Hung Kai Properties as part of the Ma Wan Development joint venture project and completed from 2002 to 2006 in six phases. There are around 10,000 to 15,000 residents.

Phases
 Phase 1 comprises 2,569 units completed in August 2002. Sales started in August 2002.
 Phase 3 comprises 1,446 units completed during the second half of 2004. Sales started in June 2004.
 Phases 5 and 6 contain nine blocks of low-to-medium-rise apartment blocks. Sale for Phase 5 started in August 2006.

Transport
Similar to the Lantau Island private housing estate Discovery Bay, Park Island has its own shuttle bus and ferry routes operated by Park Island Transport Company Limited to Tsuen Wan, Tsing Yi, Kwai Fong, Hong Kong International Airport, and Central.

Bus routes
NR330: Park Island ←→ Tsing Yi station
NR331: Ma Wan (Pak Yan Road) ←→ Tsuen Wan station
NR331S: Ma Wan (Pak Yan Road) ←→ Tsuen Wan (Nina Tower) Bus Terminus
NR332: Park Island ←→ Kwai Fong Metroplaza
NR334: Park Island ←→ Hong Kong International Airport (Passenger Terminal)

Ferry routes
Park Island ←→ Central Piers (Pier 2)
Park Island ←→ Tsuen Wan Pier (near West Rail Tsuen Wan West station).

Gallery

References

External links

Park Island website
MaWan Community Forum
MaWan Community Forum
Park Island Blog
PI Dog Club
Dr Edward Cy Yiu, 3.2 Real Estate Development Finance (REDF), Department of Real Estate and Construction, University of Hong Kong, January 2007, pp.24–30

Ma Wan
Private housing estates in Hong Kong
Sun Hung Kai Properties